Benjamin Jackson Burnley IV (born March 10, 1978) is an American musician, singer, songwriter, and record producer, best known as the founder and frontman of the American rock band Breaking Benjamin. As the sole constant of the group, Burnley has served as its principal songwriter, lead vocalist, and guitarist since its inception in 1999. Since signing with Hollywood Records in 2002, Burnley has composed six studio albums under the name Breaking Benjamin, three of which have reached platinum and two of which have reached gold in the United States. Outside of Breaking Benjamin, Burnley has also collaborated with acts such as Adam Gontier and Red.

Burnley's lyrical content frequently and most recently consists of cryptic, angst-ridden themes that "waffle between being plaintive and aggressive." Burnley has the range of a dramatic tenor and occasionally utilizes death growls and screams in his singing. IGN described him as having a "somewhat innocuous voice that is crystal clear... fluctuating between contemplative subjectivity and growling anger." Burnley uses baritone guitars and drop tunings to get a heavier sound in his music.

Life and career

Early life and career beginnings
Burnley was born in Atlantic City, New Jersey, and grew up in Ocean City, New Jersey, before moving with his family at the age of 12 to the Snyder County town of Selinsgrove, Pennsylvania. At 16, he became home schooled and quickly passed the GED requirement. At 21, he moved to Wilkes-Barre, Pennsylvania, where he became a roommate of former Breaking Benjamin bass player Jonathan Price. During his early teen years he taught himself to play guitar by listening to Nirvana's Nevermind (he cites Nirvana as his biggest influence). Before Breaking Benjamin was formed, Ben Burnley earned money playing cover songs, mixed in with his own in various coffee houses and other all age venues mostly with local neighboring musicians.

Breaking Benjamin

In 1998, Burnley and former lead guitarist Aaron Fink got together (along with Nick Hoover and Chris Lightcap) and started the band "Breaking Benjamin". Eventually, Ben wanted to try something different and went out to California to try some new material. The other three members went on to form the band Strangers With Candy (later known as Lifer). They recruited old friend Mark Klepaski to play bass and he joined in, and shortly after, Nick Hoover was asked to leave the band.

In 1999, Ben Burnley moved back to Pennsylvania, and started a band called "Plan 9" with drummer Jeremy Hummel. Originally, the band was a three-piece. The lineups consisted of Benjamin on vocals and electric guitar, Jeremy on drums, and Jason Davoli on bass. Plan 9 would occasionally open for Lifer at home shows. During one show, Ben said "Thank you, we're Breaking Benjamin," thus reclaiming the name from 1998. Later on, Mark left Lifer and found himself playing bass for Breaking Benjamin. Lifer continued going through struggles, and months later, Aaron Fink sat in for a set with Benjamin. Finally, Aaron left Lifer, and was offered a spot in Ben Burnley's band, and they became a four-piece.

Collaborations
Burnley has collaborated and performed with other acts as well. He has performed numerous live duets with fellow alternative metal bands such as Three Days Grace, Evans Blue and Disturbed. He made a guest spot on a special remix of The Drama Club's single "Brand New Day." He also co-wrote the Red hit song "Shadows" and Madam Adam song "Forgotten". Burnley has collaborated with former Three Days Grace singer Adam Gontier on a song titled "The End of the Day" (yet to be released).

Personal life
Burnley has several phobias, a fact that inspired the title of their 2006 album Phobia. Phobias cover, which depicts a winged man hovering above the ground, represents Burnley's fear of flying, which has prevented Breaking Benjamin from touring outside the United States and Canada in the past. However in May 2016, he and his band members traveled through ferry ship to Europe and made their first musical tour outside of the US and Canada. Breaking Benjamin again toured Europe in 2017 successfully. Burnley also suffers from hypochondria and a fear of the dark. He says that he does not believe in a person's time to die and he wants to put off dying for as long as he possibly can, which is why he does not fly or even ride in a car unless it is necessary. He incorporates his phobias into his music on the album We Are Not Alone in the song "Break My Fall", in which a pilot is heard over the music saying, "Mayday, mayday. Request permission to land. I cannot control the plane. We are in danger of crashing."

Burnley is an avid video gamer, and conceived of the idea for Breaking Benjamin to write and record the song "Blow Me Away" for the soundtrack to Halo 2. The song "Polyamorous" is also featured on the games Run Like Hell, WWE SmackDown! vs. Raw and WWE Day of Reckoning (along with their song "Firefly"). "The Diary of Jane" appears on NASCAR 07.

Burnley is a recovering alcoholic, admitting in an interview that he wanted to "drink himself to death." He says that he regrets ever drinking a drop of alcohol and suffers from Wernicke–Korsakoff syndrome due to his past excessive drinking. Dear Agony was reported to be the first ever Breaking Benjamin record to be written by Burnley without the use of alcohol.

He has a son born in 2014.

References

1978 births
20th-century American singers
21st-century American singers
Alternative metal guitarists
Alternative rock guitarists
Alternative rock singers
American alternative rock musicians
American heavy metal guitarists
American heavy metal singers
American lyricists
American male guitarists
American male singer-songwriters
Record producers from Pennsylvania
American rock songwriters
American tenors
Breaking Benjamin members
Heavy metal producers
Living people
People from Atlantic City, New Jersey
People from Ocean City, New Jersey
People from Wilkes-Barre, Pennsylvania
Post-grunge musicians
Rhythm guitarists
Singer-songwriters from Pennsylvania
People from Selinsgrove, Pennsylvania
Hypochondriacs
Guitarists from Pennsylvania